Molla Yaqub Rural District is in the Central District of Sarab County, East Azerbaijan province, Iran. At the National Census of 2006, its population was 6,659 in 1,476 households. There were 6,329 inhabitants in 1,760 households at the following census of 2011. At the most recent census of 2016, the population of the rural district was 6,071 in 1,794 households. The largest of its 20 villages was Ardeha, with 1,647 people.

References 

Sarab County

Rural Districts of East Azerbaijan Province

Populated places in East Azerbaijan Province

Populated places in Sarab County